Axel Siefer (born November 30, 1950) is a German actor.

Biography 
Axel Siefer attended the Acting School in Stuttgart, Southern Germany from 1969 to 1973. Since 1971 he has worked as stage-, TV- and film- actor and director. He became known to a wider audience in Germany thanks to his role as father of Daniela 'Danni' Lowinski in the TV series Danni Lowinski, which started in 2010.

Apart from his work as actor and director Axel Siefer was involved in the foundation and management of several theaters in Germany. Furthermore, he wrote a book with the title Als Schubert so alt war wie ich…, where he worked up his twenty-year-old stage experience in the role as contrabassist in Patrick Süskind's Der Kontrabaß.

Filmography (selection) 
 1996: Gefährliche Freundin (TV movie)
 1998: Der Fahnder (TV series, Appearance in one episode)
 1999: The Princess and the Warrior (Der Krieger und die Kaiserin)
 2001: Antonia - Zwischen Liebe und Macht (TV movie)
 2002: Verbotene Liebe (TV soap opera, Appearance in four episodes from 1999 to 2002)
 2003: The Tenth Summer (Der 10. Sommer) 
 2003: Und Tschüß, ihr Lieben (TV movie)
 2003: SK Kölsch (TV series, Appearance in one episode)
 2004: Stromberg (TV series, Appearance in one episode)
 2006:  (Der Liebeswunsch) (TV movie)
 2006: Crime Scene (Tatort) (TV series)
 2007: Stolberg (TV series, Appearance in 1 episode)
 2008:  (Die Entdeckung der Currywurst)
 2009: Lindenstraße (TV soap opera, Appearance in five episodes in various roles) 
 2010: Der verlorene Vater (TV movie)
 2010: Alarm für Cobra 11 – Die Autobahnpolizei (TV series, Appearance in one episode)
 2011: Neander-Jin: The Return of the Neanderthal Man
 2011: Aschenputtel (TV movie)
 2013: Trimbelten
 2013: Danni Lowinski (TV series, Appearance in 52 episodes from 2010 to 2013)

References

External links 
 

1950 births
Living people
German male film actors
German male stage actors
German male television actors
Place of birth missing (living people)